Spot On is a New Zealand children's television programme that aired between from 1973 to 1988. The format was a weekly programme with three presenters, based on the format of the British programme Blue Peter where they would introduce their young audience to experiences they may not be familiar with, going out in the field and participating in jobs, events, or sports, to learn what is involved. Examples include fire-fighting, flying in rescue helicopters, visiting a chocolate factory, rock climbing and abseiling, or travelling to other countries. Studio-bound sketches and interviews filled out the half-hour show.

Commonly one presenter was replaced each year. The programme was produced by TVNZ at their Dunedin studios, except for the final two seasons produced at the TVNZ Studio 4 facility in Christchurch.

Presenters 
 Ray Millard
 Erin Dunleavy
 Douglas Blair
 Evelyn Skinner
 Ian Taylor
 Danny Watson
 Margaret Rishworth (Campbell)
 Marcus Turner
 Helen McGowan
 Sandy Beverley
 Peta Carey
 Ole Maiava
 Wendy Nuzum
 Josie McNee
 Phil Keoghan
 Amber Cunliffe

Producers 
 Murray Hutchinson
 Michael Stedman
 Huntly Eliott
 Judith Thomas
 Ian Garner

References

External links

 Spot On series overview at NZ On Screen

New Zealand children's television series
1970s New Zealand television series
1980s New Zealand television series
1973 New Zealand television series debuts
1988 New Zealand television series endings
TVNZ original programming